Henry Crewe  may refer to:

Henry Harpur-Crewe
Henry Crewe Boutflower